Serge Poudrier (born 22 April 1966) is a Canadian-born French former ice hockey player. He competed in the men's tournaments at the 1992, the 1994 and the 1998 Winter Olympics.

References

External links

1966 births
Living people
Anglet Hormadi Élite players
Augsburger Panther players
EHC Black Wings Linz players
Boxers de Bordeaux players
Canadian ice hockey defencemen
Dragons de Rouen players
French ice hockey defencemen
HC Fribourg-Gottéron players
Hannover Scorpions players
Ice hockey people from Quebec
Ice hockey players at the 1992 Winter Olympics
Ice hockey players at the 1994 Winter Olympics
Ice hockey players at the 1998 Winter Olympics
Lausanne HC players
Olympic ice hockey players of France
Sportspeople from Thetford Mines
Trois-Rivières Draveurs players